The 2008 AFC Champions League Final was a two-legged football tie to determine the 2008 champions of Asian club football. Gamba Osaka defeated Adelaide United 5-0 on aggregate to take the title. The first leg took place on 5 November 2008 at 19:00 local time (UTC+9) at Osaka Expo '70 Stadium in Osaka and the second leg took place on 12 November 2008 at 19:30 local time (UTC+10:30) at Hindmarsh Stadium, Adelaide.

It was the first final to feature a club from Australia and the second consecutive season with a Japanese finalist. The winners, Gamba Osaka, received US$600,000 prize money and qualified to represent Asia in the 2008 FIFA Club World Cup, where they were defeated in the semi-finals by Premier League and UEFA Champions League winners Manchester United. Despite losing this final, Adelaide United also qualified for the FIFA Club World Cup by replacing the host country berth, which was provisionally reserved for the J. League champions, and were defeated once again by Gamba Osaka in the quarter-finals.

Format
The rules for the final were exactly the same as for the previous knockout rounds. The tie was contested over two legs with away goals deciding the winner if the two teams were level on goals after the second leg. If the teams could still not be separated at that stage then extra time would have been played with a penalty shootout taking place if the teams were still level after that.

Route to the final

Note: In all results below, the score of the finalist is given first (H: home; A: away).

Pre-final buildup
Adelaide United considered applying for permission to play their home leg in a stadium larger than Hindmarsh such as Adelaide Oval or AAMI Stadium but the club eventually decided that it would not be right to play such a big match away from their traditional home despite its smaller capacity.

Final summary

|}

First leg

Second leg

See also
 2008 AFC Champions League
 2008 FIFA Club World Cup

References

External links
 AFC Champions League
 Adelaide United Official Website
 Gamba Osaka Official Website
  Gamba Osaka Official Website

Final, 2008
AFC
AFC
AFC Champions League Final 2008
AFC Champions League Final 2008
International club association football competitions hosted by Japan
International club association football competitions hosted by Australia
AFC Champions League finals